The Church of Saint Gregory VII, also called San Gregorio Settimo, is a Roman Catholic parish church on the Via del Cottolengo (Via Gregorio VII) in Rome dedicated to Pope Saint Gregory VII (r. 1073–1085).  It was built by Mario Paniconi and Giulio Pediconi from 1960 to 1961, to serve a parish erected by Pope Pius XII in 1952.  Its roof is held up by 10 concrete piers, and is structurally independent of the walls, which end before they reach the roof (the empty space between them being filled with glass).  It is a parish church, served by Franciscans; in the crypt is a depiction of the Life of St Francis of Assisi in an unusual stone inlay technique.  San Gregorio VII has been a titular church since 1969. The current Cardinal Priest of the Titulus Chiesa di San Gregorio VII is  Cardinal Cleemis , the Major Archbishop of Trivandrum.

Cardinal-priests of San Gregorio VII 
Eugênio de Araújo Sales (1969–2012)
Baselios Cleemis Thottunkal (since 2012)

References

External links

Syro-Malankara Catholic Church

Gregorio
Christian organizations established in 1952
Roman Catholic churches completed in 1961
20th-century Roman Catholic church buildings in Italy
Rome Q. XIII Aurelio
1952 establishments in Italy